Quri Bolagh (also Romanized as Qūrī Bolāgh) is a village in Qaleh Darrehsi Rural District, in the Central District of Maku County, West Azerbaijan Province, Iran. At the 2006 census, its population was 65, in 14 families.

References 

Populated places in Maku County